Fort Charlotte may refer to:

Events
 Battle of Fort Charlotte

Places

Bahamas
 Fort Charlotte, Nassau

British Virgin Islands
 Fort Charlotte, Tortola

Canada
 Fort Charlotte (Halifax, Nova Scotia)

Saint Lucia
Fort Charlotte, Castries

Saint Vincent and the Grenadines
 Fort Charlotte, Saint Vincent

United Kingdom
 Fort Charlotte, Shetland

United States
 Fort Charlotte, Grand Portage
 Fort Charlotte, Mobile
 Fort Charlotte (South Carolina)